Swamp cypress is a common name for more than one species of plants in the family Cupressaceae (cypresses):
 Species of the genus Taxodium
 Taxodium distichum, native to the Southeastern and Gulf Coastal Plains of the United States
 Glyptostrobus pensilis, native to subtropical southeastern China
 Actinostrobus pyramidalis, native to southwest Western Australia